Miel may refer to:

 Miel (Swisttal), a small village in Germany
 Miel Bredouw (b. 1989), American comedian and musician
 Alice Miel (1906–1998), an American educator and author
 Jan Miel (1599–1663), a Flemish painter from the 17th century.
 Movimiento Independiente Euro Latino, a Spanish political party
 The pseudonym of an award-winning senior artist at The Straits Times
 Café miel a flavored coffee drink
 "Miel", a song by Arca from ''Arca